Aradhya National Convent School, Ashok Nagar is located at Chandpur Bhangaha in Purnia district of Bihar, India.

See also
Education in India
Purnia

References

External links

Schools in Bihar
Purnia district
Educational institutions established in 2013
2013 establishments in Bihar